Panillo is a locality located in the municipality of Graus, in Huesca province, Aragon, Spain. As of 2020, it has a population of 74.

Geography 
Panillo is located 96km east-northeast of Huesca.

References

Populated places in the Province of Huesca